Hypochra albufera is a species of ulidiid or picture-winged fly in the genus Hypochra of the family Ulidiidae.

References

Ulidiidae